Heun is an unincorporated community in Colfax County, Nebraska, United States.

History
Heun was named for its founder, William Heun, a native of Germany.

References

Populated places in Colfax County, Nebraska
Unincorporated communities in Nebraska